Hypsotropa unipunctella is a species of snout moth in the genus Hypsotropa. It was described by Ragonot in 1888, and is known from Hungary, Romania and Slovakia.

The wingspan is about 16 mm.

References

Moths described in 1888
Anerastiini
Moths of Europe